Emma Karlsson (born 16 May 1998) is a retired Swedish badminton player. She won gold at the 2017 European Junior Championships in the girls' doubles event with her partner, Johanna Magnusson. Karlsson won her first senior international title at the 2018 Swedish Open, and at the 2019 Norwegian International she claimed two titles in the women's and mixed doubles events.

Karlsson retired from the international badminton in November 2020.

Personal life 
Karlsson educated Sports Science and Management at the Malmö University, and in 2019, she received an elite sports scholarship from the Swedish Sports Confederation.

Achievements

European Junior Championships 
Girls' doubles

BWF International Challenge/Series (3 titles, 4 runners-up) 
Women's doubles

Mixed doubles

  BWF International Challenge tournament
  BWF International Series tournament
  BWF Future Series tournament

BWF Junior International (2 titles, 2 runners-up) 
Girls' singles

Girls' doubles

  BWF Junior International Grand Prix tournament
  BWF Junior International Challenge tournament
  BWF Junior International Series tournament
  BWF Junior Future Series tournament

References

External links 
 

1998 births
Living people
People from Älmhult Municipality
Swedish female badminton players
Badminton players at the 2019 European Games
European Games competitors for Sweden
Sportspeople from Kronoberg County
21st-century Swedish women